Tarkio is the third album by Brewer & Shipley. Released in 1970, the album (also known as Tarkio Road, as that title was printed on the labels of original pressings of the LP and pre-recorded tapes) yielded the hit singles "One Toke Over the Line" and "Tarkio Road."

The title came about when they left California in 1969 returning to the Midwest, this time to Kansas City, Missouri, where they played college towns in Iowa, Nebraska, Missouri, and Kansas. The title referred to songs that came to mind when they were driving to and from Kansas City to their gigs in Nebraska and Iowa on the 2-lane U.S. Route 59 which went through Tarkio, Missouri. In 2011 they held an outdoor concert in downtown Tarkio to celebrate the anniversary of the album.  Some reports have erroneously indicated the album was inspired by a 1969 concert at the Mule Barn at Tarkio College but the group has maintained the song was based on the road.

Tarkio Road reached #41 in Canada and number 27 in Australia.

Jerry Garcia contributed a distinctive steel guitar intro to the track "Oh Mommy," which was purportedly a plea to throw Richard Nixon out of office. The album also features John Kahn and Bill Vitt on bass guitar and drums, respectively; they were regulars of The Jerry Garcia Band.

Track listing
All tracks written by Brewer & Shipley except where noted.

Side A
 "One Toke Over the Line" – 3:16
 "Song from Platte River" – 3:15
 "The Light" – 3:09
 "Ruby on the Morning" – 2:15
 "Oh Mommy" – 3:03

Side B
 "Don't Want to Die in Georgia" – 3:45
 "Can't Go Home" – 2:29
 "Tarkio Road" – 4:30
 "Seems Like a Long Time" (Ted Anderson) – 4:12
 "Fifty States of Freedom" – 6:49

A CD reissue in 1996 added the following tracks
 "This Seat Occupado (Fly-Fly-Fly)" (Brewer & Shipley)
 "The Mighty Quinn" (Bob Dylan)

Personnel
 Mike Brewer – vocals, guitars
 Tom Shipley – vocals, guitars
 Mark Naftalin – piano, organ
 John Kahn – bass
 Fred Burton – electric guitar
 Bill Vitt, Bob Jones – drums
 Noel Jewkes – flute
 Jerry Garcia – pedal steel guitar
Technical
 Stephen Barncard - engineer
 Nick Gravenites - producer

References

1970 albums
Brewer & Shipley albums
Albums produced by Nick Gravenites
Kama Sutra Records albums